The position of Lord Mayor of Leicester is a mainly ceremonial post, being the title of the chairman of the Leicester City Council. The Mayor is elected annually by the members of the council. 

The role of Lord Mayor is in many ways similar to that carried out by the Speaker of the House of Commons.

From the Middle Ages until 1928 the title was simply Mayor of Leicester. Until the 19th century, the mayors were usually elected annually by the Corporation of Leicester. Since the development of forms of local democracy, the mayors and Lord Mayors of the city have been elected indirectly from among elected councillors and aldermen, but since 1971 no unelected aldermen have been entitled to vote.

History
The first mayor of Leicester was the Norman knight "Peter fitz Roger" (Peter son of Roger) in 1251. The title was elevated to "Lord Mayor" by letters patent dated 10 July 1928. This was confirmed for the reorganised non-metropolitan district by letters patent dated 1 April 1974.

The first Asian Lord Mayor of Leicester, Gordhan Parmar, was elected in 1987. The first Black Lord Mayor, George Cole, was appointed in 2022.

After institution of a directly elected mayor in 2011 the Lord Mayor of Leicester still exists as a ceremonial role under Leicester City Council.

List of mayors
Mayors of Leicester include:

1499 William Wyggeston, MP for Leicester, 1504
1510 William Wyggeston
1521 Robert Harward, MP for Leicester, 1529
1541 Hugh Aston, MP for Leicester, 1554
1545 Robert Cotton, MP for Leicester, 1553
1576 John Stanford, MP for Leicester, 1572 and 1593
1592 John Stanford
1615 William Ive, MP for Leicester, 1624
1625 William Ive
1634 William Ive
1688 William Bentley
1732 Gabriel Newton
1741 John Cartwright
1759 Nicholas Throsby
1771 John Cartwright
1776 Joseph Johnson, Esq, succeeded by Samuel Jordan before Nov 1776
1777 Samuel Jordan, Esq,
1793 John Mansfield Snr, co-founder Oliver & Mansfield - Leicester Bank
1815 John Mansfield Jnr
1836 Thomas Paget, MP for Leicestershire, 1831
1837 Robert Brewin
1838 Thomas Stokes
1839 Joseph Whetstone
1840 John Biggs MP for Leicester 1855–62
1841 Thomas Stokes
1842 William Biggs, MP for Newport, Isle of Wight, 1852
1843 Richard Harris
1844 John Mellor
1845 Edward Weston
1846 Joseph Fielding
1847 John Biggs
1848 William Biggs
1849 Thomas Nunneley
1850 John Dove Harris, MP for Leicester, 1857 and 1865
1851 George Toller
1852 John Manning
1853 Samuel How
1854 Richard Harris junior
1855 John Biggs
1856 John Dove Harris
1856 Joseph Underwood
1857 Joseph Underwood
1859 William Biggs
1859 James Francis Hollings
1860 Edward Shipley Ellis
1861 Samuel Viccars
1862 George Toller
1863 George Baines
1864 Alfred Burgess
1865 Thomas William Hodges
1866 Thomas William Hodges
1867 Thomas William Hodges
1868 John Baines
1869 George Stevenson
1870 John Stafford
Leicester county borough (created 1889)
1889 Henry Lankester
1890 William Kempson
1891 Thomas Wright
1892 John Underwood
1893 Israel Hart
1894 George Green
1895 Edward Wood
1896 Joseph Herbert Marshall
1897 Arthur Wakerley
1898 George Clifton
1899 Thomas Windley

20th century
1900-01 Alderman Samuel Lennard 
1901-02 Thomas Windley
1902-03 Alderman William Wilkins Vincent
1903-04 Albert Edwin Sawday
1904-05 Stephen Hilton
1905-06 Henry Bailey Bruce
1906-07 Edward Wood
1907-08 Thomas Smith
1908-09 Charles Lakin
1909-10 George Chitham
1910-11 William Wilkins Vincent
1911-12 Arthur Tollington 
1912-13 James McCall
1913-14 John Russell Frears
1914–17 Jonathan North (three terms)
1918-19 Walter John Lovell
1919-20 Jabez Chaplin
1920-21 George Edward Hilton
1921-22 James Wedgwood Heath
1922-23 Amos Sherriff
1923-24 John Mantle Hubbard
1924-25 Herbert Simpson
1925-26 George Banton
1926-27 Thomas Watson Walker

List of lord mayors

James Thomas (1927–1928)
Harry Hand (1928–1929)
William Hincks (1929–1930)
Harry Carver (1930–1931)
Walter Wilford (1931–1932)
Arthur Hawkes (1932–1933)
William Billings (1933–1934)
Ernest Grimsley (1934–1935)
Richard Hallam (1935–1936)
Arthur Swain (1936–1937)
Frank Acton (1937–1938)
Thomas Gooding (1938–1939)
George Parbury (1939–1940)
William Joseph Cort (1940–1941)
Elizabeth Rowley Frisby (1941–1942)
Sydney Taylor (1942–1943)
Charles Edward Gillot (1943–1944)
John Minto (1944–1945)
Charles Edward Worthington,  (1945–1946)
William Henry Smith (1946–1947)
John Newton Frears (1947–1949)
John William Wale (1949–1950)
Frederick Ernest Oliver (1950–1951)
Aderman Thomas Rowland Hill (1951–1952)
Geoffrey Morris Barnett (1952–1953)
Charles Robert Keene (1953–1954)
Cecil Herbert Harris (1954–1955)
Samuel Cooper (1955–1956)
Alfred Harkyard (1956–1957)
Frederick John Jackson (1957–1958)
Sidney Brown (1958–1959)
Bertram Powell (1959–1960)
Dorothy Russell (1960–1961)
May Goodwin (1961–1962)
Harold Heard (1962–1963)
Constance Elizabeth Jackson (1963–1964)
Archibald Henry William Kimberlin (1964–1965)
Sidney William Bridges (1965–1966)
Mrs Monica Mary Trotter (1966–1967)
Sir Mark Henig (1967–1968)
Kenneth William Bowder (1968–1969)
Edward Marston (1969–1970)
George Baldwin (1970–1971)
Percy Watts (1971–1972)
Herbert Stanley Tomlinson (1972–1973)
Clarence Arnold Wakefield (1973–1974)
Leicester non-metropolitan district
Mrs Anne Irene Pollard (1974–1975)
Mrs Lily Roma Marriott, JP (1975–1976)
Bernard Toft (1976–1977)
Albert Turner Baker (1977–1978)
Albert Sylvester Watson (1978–1979)
William Henry Scotton (1979–1980)
Herbert Henry Sowden (1980–1981)
Archibald Berridge (1981–1982)
William Page (1982–1983)
George Billington (1983–1984)
Michael Cufflin (1984–1985)
Mrs Janet Setchfield (1985–1986)
Sydney St. John Phipps (1986–1987)
Gordhan Parmar (1987–1988)
Guy Collis (1988–1989)
David Anthony Taylor (1989–1990)
Peter Kimberlin (1990–1991)
Colin Grundy (1991–1992)
Robert Wigglesworth (1992–1993)
Henry Dunphy (1993–1994)
Margaret Bell (1994–1995)
Michael Johnson (1995–1996)
Culdipp Bhatti (1996–1997)
Raymond Flint (1997–1998)
John Mugglestone (1998–1999)
Phil Swift (1999–2000)
Mrs Barbara Chambers (2000–2001)
John Allen (2001–2002)
Maggie Bodell-Stagg (2002–2003)
Ramnik Kavia (2003–2004)
Piara Singh Clair (2004–2005)
Mary Draycott (2005–2006)
Paul Westley (2006–2007)
Gary G Hunt (2007–2008)
Manjula Sood (2008–2009)
Roger Blackmore (2009–2010)
Colin Hall (2010–2011)
Robert Wann (2011–2012)
Abdul Osman (2012–2013)
Mustafa Kamal (2013–2014)
John Thomas (2014–2015)
Ted Cassidy (2015–2016)
Stephen Corrall (2016–2017)
Rashmikant Joshi (2017–2018)
Ross Grant (2018–2019)
Annette Byrne (2019–2021)
Deepak Bajaj (2021–2022)
George Cole (2022–2023)

References

Leicester
Leicester
Leicestershire-related lists